A total lunar eclipse will take place on June 28, 2094. The moon will pass through the center of the Earth's shadow. While the visual effect of a total eclipse is variable, the Moon may be stained a deep orange or red color at maximum eclipse. With a gamma value of only 0.0288 and an umbral eclipse magnitude of 1.8234, this is the greatest eclipse in Saros series 131 as well as the second largest and darkest lunar eclipse of the 21st century.

Visibility

Related lunar eclipses

Saros series

Half-Saros cycle
A lunar eclipse will be preceded and followed by solar eclipses by 9 years and 5.5 days (a half saros). This lunar eclipse is related to two annular solar eclipses of Solar Saros 138 (1 before 2100 Dec 31).

See also 
List of lunar eclipses and List of 21st-century lunar eclipses

Notes

External links 

2094-06
2094-06
2094 in science
Central total lunar eclipses